Brasa is a neighbourhood of Riga, the capital of Latvia.

See also 
 Great Cemetery (Riga)

References

Neighbourhoods in Riga